Columba is a unisex given name meaning dove which may refer to:

Religious figures
 Columba (521–597), Irish prince who evangelised the Picts, and one of Scotland's patron saints
 Columba of Rieti (1467-1501), Dominican beatified mystic 
 Columba of Sens (c. 257-273), saint and martyr
 Columba of Spain (died c. 853), nun, saint and martyr
 Columba of Terryglass (died 553), saint and one of the Twelve Apostles of Ireland
 Columba the Virgin, Christian saint who probably lived in the 6th century
 Columba Cary-Elwes (1903-1994), English priest, missionary and author
 Columba de Dunbar (c. 1386-1435), Bishop of Moray
 Columba Marmion (1858-1923), beatified Irish monk and third abbot of Maredsous Abbey
 Columba Murphy (fl. 1835), Irish Roman Catholic priest
 Columba Ryan (1916-2009), Dominican priest and philosophy teacher
 Columba Stewart (born 1957), American Benedictine monk and scholar

Other
 Columba Blango (politician) (born 1956), former decathlete and Mayor of Southwark
 Columba Blango (paralympian) (born 1992), British parasports runner
 Columba Bush (born 1953), wife of former Florida Governor Jeb Bush and sister-in-law of President George W. Bush
 Columba Domínguez (born 1929), Mexican retired actress
 Columba McDyer (1921-2001), Gaelic football player
 Columba McVeigh (1958–1975), Northern Irish teenager murdered by the IRA

References

Given names derived from birds
Unisex given names